The 2014 edition of the POC-PSC Philippine National Games was held in Manila on May 17 to 23, 2014. The Philippine Air Force won the championship.

Pools composition

Venue
 Arellano University, Taft Avenue, Pasay
 Ninoy Aquino Stadium, Manila

Pool standing procedure
Match won 3–0 or 3–1: 3 points for the winner, 0 points for the loser
Match won 3–2: 2 points for the winner, 1 point for the loser
In case of tie, the teams will be classified according to the following criteria:
number of matches won, sets ratio and points ratio

Preliminary round

Pool A

|}

|}

Pool B

|}

|}

Final round

Semifinals
25-21, 25-15, 25-14. 

|}

3rd place match

|}

Final

|}

Final standing

Awards

Most Valuable Player
Iari Yongco (Philippine Air Force)
Best Attacker
Victonara Galang (De La Salle Lady Spikers)
Best Blocker
Mika Aereen Reyes (De La Salle Lady Spikers)
Best Server
Kim Fajardo (De La Salle Lady Spikers)

Best Setter
Rhea Katrina Dimaculangan (Philippine Air Force)
Best Receiver
Angeli Tabaquero (Cagayan Valley Lady Rising Suns)
Best Digger
Mary Ann Balmaceda (Philippine Air Force)

References

External links 
 Official Website

Volleyball in the Philippines
2014 in women's volleyball
2014 in Philippine women's sport